Chakib Arslane Mazari (born January 6, 1989) is an Algerian football player. He is currently playing for RC Relizane in the Algerian Ligue Professionnelle 2.

Club career
Sofiane Bouterbiat signed with MC Oran in the summer of 2012, joining them on a free transfer from ASM Oran.

Honours

Club
 USM Alger
 Algerian Ligue Professionnelle 1 (1): 2015-16

References

External links
 

1989 births
Living people
Footballers from Oran
Algerian footballers
Algerian Ligue Professionnelle 1 players
Association football defenders
ASM Oran players
USM El Harrach players
MC Saïda players
MC Oran players
USM Alger players
DRB Tadjenanet players
CS Constantine players
MO Béjaïa players
RC Relizane players
21st-century Algerian people